Escalera is a Spanish surname. Notable people with the surname include:

Alfredo Escalera (born 1952), Puerto Rican boxer
Alfredo L. Escalera (born 1995), Puerto Rican baseball player
Carlos Escalera (born 1979), Puerto Rican baseball player
Katia Escalera, Bolivian singer
Nino Escalera (1929–2021), Puerto Rican baseball player
Rodolfo Escalera (1929–2000), Mexican-American artist
Irene Cara Escalera (1959-2022), American singer, songwriter, and actress

See also
Carlos Escaleras (1958–1997), Honduran politician and activist

Spanish-language surnames